Philip Falkerson Voorhees (23 February 1792 – 23 February 1862) was an officer in the United States Navy, who served during the War of 1812, and later commanded the East India Squadron.

Biography
Voorhees was born in New Brunswick, New Jersey, the son of John Voorhees and Keziah Falkerson.

He was promoted to a commander on 24 April 1828, and to a captain on 28 February 1838. He was assigned to command of the frigate  on her first cruise to the Mediterranean Sea in 1842. In December 1843, Voorhees joined Commodore Daniel Turner's Brazil Squadron blockading Montevideo in safeguarding U.S. trade during Uruguayan Civil War.

The U.S. Navy stayed aloof from lower-South American troubles. On 29 September 1844, however, Voorhees showed himself to be quick-tempered and impulsive. He captured an armed Argentine schooner that delivered a mail to the Argentine commanding officer. This overreaction damaged the US-Argentina relation.

He was tried by courts-martial in 1845 but the sentences of these courts were not approved. After a few months' suspension President Polk, in 1847, restored Voorhees to his full rank in the navy and gave him command of the East India Squadron on the flagship . He returned in 1851.

In 1855 Voorhees was placed on the reserved list. At the opening of the American Civil War he urged his assignment to active duty, but, he died a few months afterward on 23 February 1862 in Annapolis, Maryland.

References

1792 births
1862 deaths
American people of Dutch descent
People from New Brunswick, New Jersey
United States Navy personnel of the War of 1812
United States Navy admirals
Military personnel from New Jersey